Dire Enchini is a district of West Shewa Zone in Oromia Region of Ethiopia, about 40km south of Ambo town.

References 

Districts of Oromia Region